The Whitecourt Star is a weekly newspaper serving the Whitecourt, Alberta area. It is the paper of record for Whitecourt.

See also 
List of newspapers in Canada

References

External links 
Whitecourt Star

Weekly newspapers published in Alberta
Whitecourt
Postmedia Network publications